The 1961 Preakness Stakes was the 86th running of the $200,000 Preakness Stakes thoroughbred horse race. The race took place on May 20, 1961, and was televised in the United States on the CBS television network. Carry Back, who was jockeyed by John Sellers, won the race by three quarters of a length over runner-up Globemaster. Approximate post time was 5:47 p.m. Eastern Time. The race was run on a fast track in a final time of 1:57-3/5  The Maryland Jockey Club reported total attendance of 32,211, this is recorded as second highest on the list of American thoroughbred racing top attended events for North America in 1961.

Payout 

The 86th Preakness Stakes Payout Schedule

The full chart 

 Winning Breeder: Jack A. Price; (KY)
 Winning Time: 1:57 3/5
 Track Condition: Fast
 Total Attendance: 32,211

References

External links 
 

1961
1961 in horse racing
1961 in American sports
1961 in sports in Maryland
Horse races in Maryland
May 1961 sports events in the United States